Marielle Goitschel (born 28 September 1945) is a French former alpine skier. Marielle is the younger sister of Christine Goitschel, another champion skier of the time, and the aunt of speed skier Philippe Goitschel.

After great success in the 1962 World Championships and 1964 Winter Olympics, winning 5 medals including 3 golds, Goitschel was considered the world's best female skier.  She continued her domination at the 1966 World Championships in Portillo, Chile, winning medals in all 4 events, with 3 golds and one silver.  When the alpine skiing World Cup debuted a few months after those championships in January 1967, Goitschel was expected to again dominate the circuit that season.  However, she narrowly lost the overall title to Nancy Greene of Canada, but did take the discipline cup in downhill and tied for the win in slalom with her compatriot Annie Famose.  During the next season, she again missed the overall title, finishing only 4th while repeating as slalom champion.  She won her final gold medal in slalom at the 1968 Winter Olympics in Grenoble, and then retired from ski racing after that season.  Goitschel's total of 11 World Championships medals in alpine skiing is second all-time among women to the 15 won by Christl Cranz of Germany (see the note below).

Marielle and sister Christine were the first ever female siblings on the same individual's event Olympic podium, winning the gold (Christine) and silver (Marielle) medals in the 1964 Olympic Women's slalom.  They would repeat the feat two days later, switching their gold-silver order, in the 1964 Olympic Women's giant slalom.

World Cup victories

Notes
From 1948 to 1980, the alpine skiing events at the Winter Olympics also counted as the FIS Alpine World Ski Championships, so Goitschel's medals in 1964 and 1968 are double-counted in the list above (shown in both Olympics and World Championships).  Separate World Championships medals were awarded each Olympic year (in 1948, not in 1952, and since 1956) in the combined using the results of the slalom and downhill.  Also, for the only time in 1968, the results of the Olympic races counted for World Cup points, so Goitschel's slalom gold medal is also listed as a World Cup race win in the table above.

References

  Also available under .

External links 
 
 

1945 births
Living people
French female alpine skiers
Olympic alpine skiers of France
Olympic gold medalists for France
Olympic silver medalists for France
Olympic medalists in alpine skiing
Medalists at the 1964 Winter Olympics
Medalists at the 1968 Winter Olympics
Alpine skiers at the 1964 Winter Olympics
Alpine skiers at the 1968 Winter Olympics
FIS Alpine Ski World Cup champions
Sportspeople from Var (department)